Main Street Historic District is a national historic district located at Forest City, Rutherford County, North Carolina.  It encompasses 61 contributing buildings, 1 contributing site, and 1 contributing structure in the central business district of Forest City.  The district developed from the late 1880s through the 1920s, and includes notable examples of Classical Revival style architecture. Notable contributing buildings include the U.S. Post Office (1937), the Davis Sisters Building (after 1932), the Farmers Bank and Trust building (1923), National Bank of Forest City (1923), the Tuberculosis Center (1902), the Romina Theater (1928), the Town Hall (1928) designed by James J. Baldwin, the Blanton Hotel (1925), the Reinhardt Drug Company Building (by 1908), the First Wesleyan Church (1922), and the Florence Mill (1897-1941).

It was added to the National Register of Historic Places in 2002, with a boundary increase in 2004.

Gallery

References

Forest City, North Carolina
Historic districts on the National Register of Historic Places in North Carolina
Neoclassical architecture in North Carolina
Buildings and structures in Rutherford County, North Carolina
National Register of Historic Places in Rutherford County, North Carolina